William Beattie Trembley (April 21, 1877 – January 13, 1952) was a private in the United States Army and a Medal of Honor recipient for his actions in the Philippine–American War. He was later commissioned as a first lieutenant in World War I.

Trembley later served as the postmaster of Kansas City, Kansas, from 1921 to 1935.

Medal of Honor citation
Rank and organization: Private, Company B, 20th Kansas Volunteer Infantry. Place and date: At Calumpit, Luzon, Philippine Islands, 27 April 1899. Entered service at: Kansas City, Kansas. Birth: Johnson, Kansas. Date of issue: 11 March 1902.

Citation:

Swam the Rio Grande de Pampanga in face of the enemy's fire and fastened a rope to the occupied trenches, thereby enabling the crossing of the river and the driving of the enemy from his fortified position.

See also
List of Medal of Honor recipients
List of Philippine–American War Medal of Honor recipients

References

External links

Kansas National Guard Bio

1877 births
1952 deaths
United States Army Medal of Honor recipients
United States Army soldiers
Kansas postmasters
American military personnel of the Philippine–American War
Philippine–American War recipients of the Medal of Honor
People from Stanton County, Kansas